The British North Russia Squadron was a squadron of the Royal Navy based at Murmansk from 1917 to 1919.

History

The squadron was formed as part of an initiative by the Entente Powers to keep the Russian Empire in the First World War. One goal was to protect the large stockpiles of Allied material that had begun stockpiling at the ice-free port at Murmansk. Russia's continued involvement in the war was challenged externally by German advances into the East and internally by a strong antipathy to the war amongst the Russian population. This later factor had led to support for the Bolshevik Revolution and had resulted in the Russian Civil War. The squadron would remain in Russia throughout most of the Allied North Russia Intervention, though it served no real role in this.

The squadron was originally placed under the command of Rear Admiral Thomas Kemp with the Canopus-class predreadnought  as his flagship. This battleship had been refitted, with some guns being removed to allow for more accommodation for marines. There was also the cruiser , a depot ship, an armed boarding vessel and a variety of trawlers and drifters which had been converted to function as minesweepers.

In October 1918 Rear-Admiral John F.E. Green became senior British naval officer in northern Russia, relieving Admiral Kemp, who returned home. Rear-Admiral Green did not object to the withdrawal of American ships from Murmansk after July 1918, as the U.S. naval ships had been logistically dependent on the British, to whom they had been a burden.

The squadron returned to England in September 1919, shortly after the ratification of peace with Germany, with the signing of the Treaty of Versailles.

Admiral commanding
Post holders included:

References

Royal Navy squadrons
Military units and formations of the Royal Navy in World War I
Military in the Arctic
Military units and formations established in 1917
Military units and formations disestablished in 1919
Allied intervention in the Russian Civil War
Military units and formations of the Russian Civil War